Amy Fox may refer to:

Amy Fox (playwright), American playwright and screenwriter
Amy Fox (Blue Heelers), a fictional character in the Australian TV series Blue Heelers